WMBC-TV (channel 63) is an independent television station licensed to Newton, New Jersey, United States, serving the New York metropolitan area. The station is owned by the Mountain Broadcasting Corporation, and maintains studios on Clinton Road in West Caldwell, New Jersey; its transmitter is located atop One World Trade Center in Lower Manhattan.

WMBC-TV's lineup consists of brokered ethnic and religious programs, a half-hour weekday newscast, infomercials and children's programs to satisfy the Federal Communications Commission (FCC)'s "educational/informational" requirements.

History
Mountain Broadcasting was founded in 1985 by a group of Korean Americans, led by the Reverend Sun Young Joo of Wayne, New Jersey. The group secured a construction permit from the FCC to build channel 63 in 1987, and the station began operations on April 26, 1993, with a Christian religious format, running mostly programs from FamilyNet. Later in 1993, the station also began running public domain movies and film shorts from Main Street TV, along with FamilyNet programs.

In 1996, when New York City-owned WNYC-TV (channel 31, now Ion Television owned-and-operated station WPXN-TV) dropped its ethnic, foreign-language television programming following its sale to private interests, many of these programs were picked up by WMBC-TV. WMBC also dropped FamilyNet and Main Street TV programming and began to air more infomercials and religious shows directly from ministries. By 1997, it ran a blend of religion and infomercials during the day and ethnic shows at night and on Saturdays. It was also running several hours a week of educational kids' shows, and began producing a local newscast.

In the immediate aftermath of the September 11 attacks, the station temporarily simulcast NBC's flagship station WNBC (channel 4).

WMBC had an extremely weak over-the-air signal in New York City, but with a new antenna atop One World Trade Center, it can be seen more clearly. The station is also carried on most of the cable providers in that market, including Charter Spectrum and Optimum. Its signal was dropped from DirecTV's New York City local stations package on December 31, 2005; however, DirecTV resumed carriage of WMBC in early 2009.

Technical information

Subchannels
The station's digital signal is multiplexed:

Analog-to-digital conversion
WMBC-TV discontinued regular programming on its analog signal, over UHF channel 63, on February 17, 2009, to conclude the federally mandated transition from analog to digital television. The station's digital signal remained on its pre-transition UHF channel 18, using PSIP to display WMBC-TV's virtual channel as 63 on digital television receivers, which was among the high band UHF channels (52-69) that were removed from broadcasting use as a result of the transition.

See also

List of independent television stations in the United States
List of television stations in New Jersey
List of United States over-the-air television networks

References

External links
Official website

Companies based in Essex County, New Jersey
Independent television stations in the United States
Television channels and stations established in 1993
MBC-TV
MBC-TV
1993 establishments in New Jersey
Quest (American TV network) affiliates
TBD (TV network) affiliates
Japanese-language television stations